Kennedy Wilson is a global real estate investment company founded in 1977 and based in Beverly Hills, California, United States. In 1988, CEO and Chairman William J. McMorrow acquired the company. Kennedy Wilson focuses primarily on multifamily and office properties located in the Western United States, United Kingdom and Ireland. The company also provides real estate services primarily to financial services clients.

History 
Kennedy Wilson entered the European market in 2011 when it served as the lead investor in the recapitalization of the Bank of Ireland. The team became the top commercial property owners in the country, and then expanded across the continent with offices in Dublin, London, Madrid and Jersey overseeing a $4 billion property portfolio. Kennedy Wilson Europe Real Estate Plc was listed on the London Stock Exchange in 2014.

In 2017, the company closed a transaction that combined Kennedy Wilson Holdings and Kennedy Wilson Europe Real Estate Plc into one global platform with a simpler structure and an $8 billion enterprise value, generating recurring revenue of over $700 million and positioning the global company for future growth opportunities.

In 2019, it was reported that Kennedy Wilson would spend more than $600m in the next few years on various office and residential projects taking place in Ireland.

In July 2020, A $63 million loan to a multi-family development in the Boulder, Colorado area is the first investment created by a $2 billion real estate program in the US, UK, and Ireland. Global real estate investment firm Kennedy Wilson and Fairfax Financial Holdings initiated the $2 billion project.

References

External links 
 Kennedy Wilson

Companies based in Beverly Hills, California
Real estate companies of the United States
Real estate companies established in 1977
1977 establishments in California